This is an incomplete list of beaches in Palestine broken down by bodies of water they are on.

Mediterranean Sea
List of beaches along the Mediterranean Sea: see Gaza Strip.

Dead Sea

List of beaches along the West Bank shore of the Dead Sea. The beaches listed here are operated by Israeli owners, with mixed staff and open access.

 Biankini Besiesta Beach – near Kalya, West Bank
 (New) Kalia Beach – near Kalya, West Bank
 Neve Midbar beach – near Kalya, West Bank

Closed indefinitely due to sinkholes 
 Mineral Beach – near Mitzpe Shalem, West Bank. The beach was closed for renovations as of January 1, 2015 and until further notice.

See also
 List of beaches
 List of beaches in Israel

References

 
Extreme points of Earth
Lowest points
Lakes of the West Bank
Saline lakes of Asia
Borders of the West Bank
 
Divided regions
Geography of Western Asia